Mark Ignatius Furey is a Canadian politician and retired police officer, who was elected to the Nova Scotia House of Assembly in the 2013 provincial election. A member of the Nova Scotia Liberal Party, he represented the electoral district of Lunenburg West until his retirement from politics in 2021.

Furey is a retired police officer, having served in the Royal Canadian Mounted Police.

On October 22, 2013 Furey was appointed to the Executive Council of Nova Scotia where he served as Minister of Service Nova Scotia and Municipal Relations, as well as Minister responsible for Part II of the Gaming Control Act and the Minister responsible for the Residential Tenancies Act.

Furey was re-elected in the 2017 election. On June 15, 2017, premier Stephen McNeil shuffled his cabinet, moving Furey to Attorney General and Minister of Justice, Provincial Secretary, and the newly established Minister of Labour Relations.

Electoral record

|-
 
|Liberal
|Mark Furey
|align="right"|3,839
|align="right"|47.1
|align="right"|
|-
 
|Progressive Conservative
|Carole Hipwell
|align="right"|2,261
|align="right"|27.7
|align="right"|
|-
 
|New Democratic Party
|Lisa Norman
|align="right"|1,690
|align="right"|20.7
|align="right"|
|-

|}

|-
 
|Liberal
|Mark Furey
|align="right"|3,931 
|align="right"|43.10
|align="right"|
|-
 
|New Democratic Party
|Gary Ramey
|align="right"|2,885 
|align="right"|31.00
|align="right"|
|-
 
|Progressive Conservative
|David Mitchell
|align="right"|2,143 
|align="right"|23.50
|align="right"|
|}

|-
 
|New Democratic Party
|Gary Ramey
|align="right"|3,600
|align="right"|39.60
|align="right"|
|-
 
|Progressive Conservative
|Carolyn Bolivar-Getson
|align="right"|3,045
|align="right"|33.50
|align="right"|
|-
 
|Liberal
|Mark Furey
|align="right"|2,297
|align="right"|25.27
|align="right"|
|-

|}

References

Year of birth missing (living people)
Living people
Nova Scotia Liberal Party MLAs
People from Lunenburg County, Nova Scotia
Members of the Executive Council of Nova Scotia
Royal Canadian Mounted Police officers
21st-century Canadian politicians
Attorneys General of Nova Scotia